Ona Baradad Rius (born 16 April 2004) is a Spanish footballer who plays as a forward for Barcelona.

Club career
Baradad was signed up by CE Mig Segrià in 2011 when she was only 7 years old. She later joined SE AEM Lleida at the age of 12, and spent 4 years developing her game in the various levels of the club before joining Barcelona in 2020. After spending the 2020-2021 season playing for the "B" team, she finally made her debut for the first team on 10 November 2021 in Champions League against TSG Hoffenheim replacing Marta Torrejón on the 86th minutes. She scored her first goal for Barça on 6 March 2022 against Alavés in Primera División.

International career
On 10 January 2019 Baradad was invited to participate in WU17 Atlantic Tournament for Spain. In that tournament she played 33 minutes against Slovakia.

Baradad was called up for the second round of 2022 UEFA U-19 Championship qualification alongside 7 other Barcelona teammates on 31 March 2022. She scored 2 goals in three games. Her goal against Netherland six minutes before the final whistle tied the match and saved Spain from being disqualified.

References

External links
 
Ona Barardad on Instagram

2004 births
Living people
People from Segrià
Sportspeople from the Province of Lleida
Spanish women's footballers
Women's association football forwards
Women's association football wingers
Spain women's youth international footballers
Primera División (women) players
Sportswomen from Catalonia
Footballers from Catalonia
Segunda Federación (women) players
FC Barcelona Femení B players
FC Barcelona Femení players
21st-century Spanish women